Valga may refer to:
 Valga, Estonia, a town in Estonia, and its twin town Valka in Latvia
 Valga, Galicia, a town in Galicia, Spain
 Valga County, one of 15 counties of Estonia